Mathew Jay Roach (born June 14, 1957) is an American filmmaker. He is best known for directing the Austin Powers film series, Meet the Parents, Dinner for Schmucks, The Campaign, Trumbo, and Bombshell.

Roach also earned critical acclaim for directing and producing the political drama films Recount, Game Change, and All the Way. He produced these films under his Everyman Pictures banner. For his work, he has received four Primetime Emmy Awards from six nominations.

Early life and education
Roach was born and raised in Albuquerque, New Mexico, where his father was a military worker. He graduated from Eldorado High School in 1975. He received a BA in economics from Stanford University in 1980 and later earned a Master of Fine Arts in film production from the University of Southern California in 1986.

Career
Roach's early entrance into film was in music videos. His first job was working as a cameraman on the music video for Eazy-E's "Eazy-er Said Than Dunn", which was directed by his film school friend John Lloyd Miller. Roach made his directorial debut with the 1990 comedy film Zoo Radio. He received recognition for the commercially successful spy comedy film Austin Powers: International Man of Mystery (1997), starring Mike Myers as the title character. He returned to direct the sequels Austin Powers: The Spy Who Shagged Me (1999) and Austin Powers in Goldmember (2002).

Roach also directed the sports comedy-drama film Mystery, Alaska, which was released in October 1999. He continued to direct critically and commercially successful comedies, including Meet the Parents (2000) and its sequel Meet the Fockers (2004), Dinner for Schmucks (2010), and The Campaign (2012). Roach expanded into other genres, directing the biographical period drama Trumbo (2015) and the biographical drama Bombshell (2019), which earned multiple Academy Award nominations.

Roach earned critical acclaim for directing multiple HBO political drama films. He directed Recount (2008), which earned him two Primetime Emmy Awards for Outstanding Directing for a Limited Series, Movie, or Dramatic Special and Outstanding Television Movie, in addition to the Directors Guild of America Award for Outstanding Directing – Miniseries or TV Film. He then directed Game Change, about the 2008 McCain/Palin campaign, which premiered March 2012 as one of the most watched films in HBO history. The film earned him additional Primetime Emmy Awards in the same categories as well as the Golden Globe Award for Best Miniseries or Television Film and a Peabody Award. He also directed All the Way, which premiered in May 2016 and earned Roach two more Primetime Emmy Award nominations in the same categories.

Personal life
Roach is married to musician and actress Susanna Hoffs of The Bangles, with whom he has two sons. Roach was raised a Southern Baptist and converted to Judaism before marrying Hoffs.

Filmography

Film

Producer only
 The Empty Mirror (1996)
 50 First Dates (2004) (Executive producer)
 The Hitchhiker's Guide to the Galaxy (2005)
 Borat (2006)
 Charlie Bartlett (2007)
 Smother (2008)
 Brüno (2009)
 Little Fockers (2010)
 Sisters (2015)
 Mark Felt: The Man Who Brought Down the White House (2017)

Other credits

Television
TV series

TV movies

Other credits

Awards and nominations

|-
!scope="row" rowspan="2"| 2008
|rowspan="2"| Primetime Emmy Award
| Outstanding Television Movie
|rowspan="5"| Recount
| 
|rowspan="2"| 
|-
| Outstanding Directing for a Limited Series, Movie, or Dramatic Special
| 
|-
!scope="row" rowspan="3"| 2009
| Directors Guild of America Award
| Outstanding Directing – Miniseries or TV Film
| 
| 
|-
| Golden Globe Award
| Best Miniseries or Television Film
| 
| 
|-
| Producers Guild of America Award
| Best Long-Form Television
| 
| 
|-
!scope="row" rowspan="2"| 2012
|rowspan="2"| Primetime Emmy Award
| Outstanding Television Movie
|rowspan="5"| Game Change
| 
|rowspan="2"| 
|-
| Outstanding Directing for a Limited Series, Movie, or Dramatic Special
| 
|-
!scope="row" rowspan="3"| 2013
| Directors Guild of America Award
| Outstanding Directing – Miniseries or TV Film
| 
| 
|-
| Golden Globe Award
| Best Miniseries or Television Movie
| 
| 
|-
| Producers Guild of America Award
| Best Long-Form Television
| 
| 
|-
!scope="row" rowspan="2"| 2016
|rowspan="2"| Primetime Emmy Award
| Outstanding Television Movie
|rowspan="3"| All the Way
| 
|rowspan="2"| 
|-
| Outstanding Directing for a Limited Series, Movie, or Dramatic Special
| 
|-
!scope="row"| 2017
| Directors Guild of America Award
| Outstanding Directing – Miniseries or TV Film
| 
|

Notes

References

External links

 
 

1957 births
Living people
Film directors from New Mexico
Directors Guild of America Award winners
Primetime Emmy Award winners
Golden Globe Award-winning producers
Screenwriters from New Mexico
American male screenwriters
Jewish American screenwriters
American film producers
Stanford University alumni
USC School of Cinematic Arts alumni
USC School of Cinematic Arts faculty
Writers from Albuquerque, New Mexico
Artists from Albuquerque, New Mexico
Converts to Judaism from Baptist denominations
Comedy film directors
21st-century American Jews
American Jews from New Mexico